Artur Jerzy Partyka (born 25 July 1969 in Stalowa Wola, Poland) is a former Polish high jumper and two-time Olympic medalist. He won twelve national titles in a row, starting in 1989. He represented ŁKS Łódź.

His father is Algerian, his mother is Polish. He was one of the leading high jumpers of the 1990s. Partyka is one of only 21 competitors to clear the height of 2.38 metres or more. With that height he set the Polish record in high jump.

He won the bronze medal at the 1992 Summer Olympics in Barcelona and the silver medal at the 1996 Summer Olympics in Atlanta. He was also a three-time medalist at the outdoor World Championships: a two-time silver medalist (1993 and  1997) and a one-time bronze medalist (1995). He was also a silver medalist at the indoor World Championships in 1991. He also won two medals at the outdoor European Championships: silver in 1994 and gold in 1998. He won the gold medal at the indoor European Championships in 1998.

For his sport achievements, he received the Golden Cross of Merit in 1996.

Partyka has been the director of the indoor Pedros Cup in 2007, 2008, and 2009; a meet that takes place in Bydgoszcz. The competition was limited only to high jumpers and pole vaulters, but as of 2009, world-class field shot put was added.

Competition record

See also
Polish records in athletics

External links
 Artur Partyka 

 Profile on Polish Olympic Committee

1969 births
Living people
Polish male high jumpers
Athletes (track and field) at the 1988 Summer Olympics
Athletes (track and field) at the 1992 Summer Olympics
Athletes (track and field) at the 1996 Summer Olympics
Olympic athletes of Poland
Olympic silver medalists for Poland
Olympic bronze medalists for Poland
Polish people of Algerian descent
Algerian people of Polish descent
People from Stalowa Wola
World Athletics Championships medalists
European Athletics Championships medalists
Sportspeople from Podkarpackie Voivodeship
World Athletics Championships athletes for Poland
Medalists at the 1996 Summer Olympics
Medalists at the 1992 Summer Olympics
Olympic silver medalists in athletics (track and field)
Olympic bronze medalists in athletics (track and field)